Manvers is a suburb of Wath-upon-Dearne in South Yorkshire, England. Manvers may also refer to
Manvers Main Colliery, a former coal mine on the northern edge of Wath-upon-Dearne, England
Manvers Township in Ontario, Canada
Earl Manvers, a title in the Peerage of the United Kingdom
Lucy Manvers, leading character in the 2009 British TV drama The Unloved